The Roman Catholic Church in Burkina Faso is composed only of a Latin hierarchy, comprising three ecclesiastical provinces, led by Metropolitan Archbishops, which have a total of twelve suffragan dioceses.

All and only Niger is covered by the Ecclesiastical Province of Niamey, which is composed of the capital's Metropolitan Archdiocese of Niamey and a single suffrage diocese: the Roman Catholic Diocese of Maradi, seated in the southern city of Maradi.

Neither has a national episcopal conference, but the two former French Sahel colonies form a joint transnational Episcopal Conference of Burkina Faso and Niger.

There are no Eastern Catholic, pre-diocesan or other exempt jurisdictions.

There are no titular sees. All defunct jurisdictions have current successor sees.

There is an Apostolic Nunciature to Burkina Faso as papal diplomatic representation (embassy level), into which the Apostolic Nunciature to Niger is also vested.

Current Latin Dioceses

In Burkina Faso

Ecclesiastical Province of Bobo-Dioulasso 
 Metropolitan Archdiocese of Bobo-Dioulasso
Roman Catholic Diocese of Banfora
Roman Catholic Diocese of Dédougou
Roman Catholic Diocese of Diébougou
Roman Catholic Diocese of Nouna
Roman Catholic Diocese of Gaoua

Ecclesiastical Province of Koupéla 
 Metropolitan Archdiocese of Koupéla
Roman Catholic Diocese of Dori
Roman Catholic Diocese of Fada N’Gourma
Roman Catholic Diocese of Kaya
Roman Catholic Diocese of Tenkodogo

Ecclesiastical Province of Ouagadougou 
 Metropolitan Archdiocese of Ouagadougou
Roman Catholic Diocese of Koudougou
Roman Catholic Diocese of Manga
Roman Catholic Diocese of Ouahigouya.

In Niger 
 Metropolitan Archdiocese of Niamey
Roman Catholic Diocese of Maradi.

See also 
 List of Catholic dioceses (structured view)

Sources and external links 
 GCatholic.org Burkina Faso - data for all sections.
 GCatholic.org Niger - data for all sections.
 Catholic-Hierarchy entry.

Burkina Faso
Catholic dioceses
Catholic dioceses